Walter L. Rapp (1879–1974) was an architect in Cincinnati, Ohio. He was the "last member of an important Cincinnati architectural dynasty" and one of several prominent Ohio architects to graduate from  Massachusetts Institute of Technology (class of 1900). He was part of Rapp & Son after 1901; Rapp, Zettel & Rapp from 1903–1912; Zettel & Rapp from 1913–1930 and Rapp & Meacham from 1931-1958 with Standish Meacham, Rapp's son-in-law. Rapp & Meacham were best known for their residential work, projects written about in a biography on W.L. Rapp authored by his daughter, "Mrs. Standish (Eleanor) Meacham".

Projects
 Krohn Conservatory in Eden Park
 Proctor [sic] Memorial Wing of Children's Hospital in Mt. Auburn
 Jenny Porter High School in Hillsdale 
 Lotspeich School
 Lincoln National Bank building in Northwest Cincinnati on Fourth and Vine streets
 buildings of the Fifth Third Union Co.
 R.K. LeBlond Machine Tool Co. in Hyde Park/Norwood
 Cincinnati Milling Machine Co. building (which became Cincinnati Milacron, Oakley) 
 Trailmobile Co. building

Residences
 Frederick V. Geier house
 Dr. William T. and Louise Taft Semple house, called "Mt. Olympus", (demolished ca. 2007) in Indian Hill
 R. K. LeBlond mansion in Columbia Tusculum

References

Further reading
Obituaries, Cincinnati Enquirer and Cincinnati Post (3/6/1974); 
Meacham and Meacham (1982);
Painter, AIC (2006), 179

1879 births
Architects from Cincinnati
1974 deaths